Charles Patteson (11 November 1891 – 9 December 1957) was an English international hockey player, first-class cricketer and clergyman.

Patteson was born at Upper Norwood in November 1891. He was educated at Marlborough College, and returned as an assistant master when he served in the Marlborough College contingent of the Officers' Training Corps as a cadet officer. From there he went up to the University of Cambridge, where played five first-class cricket matches for Cambridge University in 1912. He scored 157 run in these five matches, at an average of 22.42 and a high score of 57. He also gained his Blue at hockey. After graduating from Cambridge he became a clergyman. Patteson played minor counties cricket for Wiltshire between 1920–22, making ten appearances in the Minor Counties Championship. He played international hockey in 1920, turning out for England against both Scotland and Ireland.

He married Isabel Mary Cornwall (daughter of Alan Cornwall) whose brother Alan Cornwall also taught at Marlborough. He held a curacy at St Mary's Lambeth and then became vicar of St Anne's, South Lambeth in 1927. Following those posts, he became Vicar of West Dulwich in 1931 and then Vicar of Scarborough in 1936. He subsequently became a Canon of York and chaplain of St Peter's School, York. Finally he became Vicar of Howden in 1956. He died on 9 December 1957 at Howden, Yorkshire.

References

External links

1891 births
1957 deaths
People from Upper Norwood
People educated at Marlborough College
Alumni of the University of Cambridge
English cricketers
Cambridge University cricketers
20th-century English Anglican priests
Wiltshire cricketers
English male field hockey players